Humnoke is a city in Lonoke County, Arkansas, United States. The population was 284 at the 2010 census. It is part of the Little Rock–North Little Rock–Conway Metropolitan Statistical Area.

Geography
Humnoke is located in southeastern Lonoke County at  (34.542238, -91.758971). U.S. Route 165 passes through the center of town, as Front Street, leading east  to Stuttgart and west  to England. Arkansas Highway 13 (Division Street) crosses US 165 in the center of Humnoke, leading north  to Carlisle and south  to Humphrey.

Crooked Creek, a tributary of Bayou Meto, winds past Humnoke to its west and south.

Demographics

As of the census of 2000, there were 280 people, 111 households, and 77 families residing in the city. The racial makeup of the city was 85.71% White, 10.36% Black or African American, 0.36% Asian, 1.79% from other races, and 1.79% from two or more races.  2.86% of the population were Hispanic or Latino of any race.

There were 111 households, out of which 36.0% had children under the age of 18 living with them, 54.1% were married couples living together, 9.9% had a female householder with no husband present, and 30.6% were non-families. 27.0% of all households were made up of individuals, and 14.4% had someone living alone who was 65 years of age or older.  The average household size was 2.52 and the average family size was 3.10.

In the city, the population was spread out, with 28.2% under the age of 18, 6.1% from 18 to 24, 32.1% from 25 to 44, 20.0% from 45 to 64, and 13.6% who were 65 years of age or older.  The median age was 33 years. For every 100 females, there were 93.1 males.  For every 100 females age 18 and over, there were 95.1 males.

The median income for a household in the city was $21,528, and the median income for a family was $28,125. Males had a median income of $27,500 versus $15,750 for females. The per capita income for the city was $15,194.  About 15.2% of families and 20.3% of the population were below the poverty line, including 23.5% of those under the age of eighteen and 27.8% of those 65 or over.

Education 
Since the consolidation of the Humnoke School District on July 1, 1998, public education for elementary and secondary school students is provided by the Carlisle School District, which leads to graduation from Carlisle High School.

References

Cities in Arkansas
Cities in Lonoke County, Arkansas
Cities in Little Rock–North Little Rock–Conway metropolitan area